Amenhotep III (Amānəḥūtpū , "Amun is Satisfied"; Hellenized as Amenophis III), also known as Amenhotep the Magnificent or Amenhotep the Great, was the ninth pharaoh of the Eighteenth Dynasty. According to different authors, he ruled Egypt from June 1386 to 1349 BC, or from June 1388 BC to December 1351 BC/1350 BC, after his father Thutmose IV died. Amenhotep was Thutmose's son by a minor wife, Mutemwiya.

His reign was a period of unprecedented prosperity and splendour, when Egypt reached the peak of its artistic and international power. When he died in the 38th or 39th year of his reign he was succeeded by his son Amenhotep IV, who later changed his name to Akhenaten.

Family and early life 

Amenhotep was the son of Thutmose IV and his minor wife Mutemwiya. He was born probably around 1401 BC. Later in his life, Amenhotep commissioned the depiction of his divine birth to be displayed at Luxor Temple. Amenhotep claimed that his true father was the god Amun, who had taken the form of Thutmose IV to father a child with Mutemwiya.

In Regnal Year 2, Amenhotep married Tiye, the daughter of Yuya and Thuya. Tiye was Great Royal Wife throughout Amenhotep's reign. Many commemorative scarabs were commissioned and distributed during Amenhotep's reign. On the "marriage scarabs," Amenhotep affirmed his divine power and the legitimacy of his wife. With Tiye, Amenhotep fathered at least two sons, Crown Prince Thutmose and Amenhotep IV (later called Akhenaten). In addition, several daughters are frequently credited to the couple: Sitamun, Henuttaneb, Iset, Nebetah, and Beketaten. Most of the daughters appear frequently on statues and reliefs from Amenhotep's reign. However, Nebetah is attested only once, on a colossal limestone group of statues from Medinet Habu, and Beketaten only appears in Amarna.Amenhotep is also sometimes credited as the father of Smenkhkare or Tutankhamun, with varying proposals for their mothers, but these theories are not as accepted as his other, known children.

Genetic analysis has confirmed he is the father of both the KV55 mummy, identified in the study as Akhenaten, and "The Younger Lady", sibling parents of his grandson, Tutankhamun. A more recent study, published in 2020, traced the family lineage via Y-chromosomes and mtDNA. Although only a partial profile was obtained, he shares his YDNA haplogroup, R1b, with his son and grandson, upholding the family tree outlined in the earlier study. However, the specific clade of R1b was not determined. In 2022, S.O.Y. Keita analysed 8 Short Tandem loci (STR) published data from studies by Hawass et al. 2010;2012 which sought to determine familial relations and research pathological features such as potential, infectious diseases among the New Kingdom royal mummies which included Tutankhamun, Amenhotep III and Rameses III. Keita, using an algorithm that only has three choices: Eurasians, Sub-Saharan Africans, and East Asians concluded that the studies showed “a majority to have an affinity with “Sub-Saharan” Africans in one affinity analysis”. However, Keita cautioned that this does not mean that the royal mummies “lacked other affiliations” which he argued had been obscured in typological thinking. Keita further added that different “data and algorithms might give different results” which reflected the complexity of biological heritage and the associated interpretation.

In addition to Tiye, Amenhotep had several other wives. In Regnal Year 10, Amenhotep married Gilukhepa, the daughter of Shuttarna II of Mitanni. He later married Tadukhepa, daughter of Tushratta of Mitanni, in or around Regnal Year 36 of his reign. Other wives, whose names are unknown, included: a daughter of Kurigalzu, king of Babylon; a daughter of Kadashman-Enlil, king of Babylon; a daughter of Tarhundaradu, ruler of Arzawa; and a daughter of the ruler of Ammia (modern-day Syria).

Finally, he followed tradition and married at least two of his daughters, Sitamun and Iset, in the last decade of his reign. Jar-label inscriptions from Regnal Year 30 indicate that Sitamun was elevated to the status of Great Royal Wife by that time. Although shunned by common Egyptians, incest was not uncommon among royalty. A sculpture restored by Amenhotep for his grandfather, Amenhotep II, shows Sitamun with a young prince beside her. This has led to theories that Sitamun was the mother of Smekhkare and/or Tutankhamun.

Life and reign

Amenhotep probably became pharaoh when he was between the ages of 6 and 12. While it is likely that a regent would have ruled until he came of age, none is attested to in the surviving records. In Regnal Year 11, Amenhotep commanded the construction of an artificial lake at Tiye's hometown of Djakaru. He then celebrated a Festival of Opening the Lake in the third month of Inundation, day sixteen, and rowed the royal barge Aten-tjehen on the lake. This event was commemorated on at least eleven commemorative scarabs.

From other scarabs, Amenhotep is known to have killed either 102 or 110 lions in the first ten years of his reign.

Despite the martial prowess Amenhotep displayed during the hunt, he is known to have participated in only one military incident. In Regnal Year Five, he led a victorious campaign against a rebellion in Kush. This victory was commemorated by three rock-carved stelae found near Aswan and Saï in Nubia. The official account of Amenhotep's military victory emphasizes his martial prowess with the period-typical hyperbole.

Court of Amenhotep III 
There is a significant attestation for the court officials who served during Amenhotep's reign, primarily through the discovery of their tombs in the Theban Necropolis. Among these court officials were the viziers Ramose, Amenhotep, Aperel, and Ptahmose. Other officials included the treasurers Ptahmose and Merire; the high stewards, Amenemhat Surer and Amenhotep (Huy); and the Viceroy of Kush, Merimose.

Amenhotep, son of Hapu held many offices during the reign of Amenhotep the pharaoh, but is best known for receiving the right to build his mortuary temple behind that of the king. Amenhotep, son of Hapu, was deified after his death and was one of the few non-royals to be worshiped in such a manner.

Malkata Palace 
The palace of Malkata was built in the 14th century BC and its ancient name was Per-Hay, "House of Rejoicing". Originally, the palace was known as the Palace of the Dazzling Aten. Built mostly out of mud-brick, it was Amenhotep's residence throughout most of the later part of his reign. Construction began around Regnal Year 11 and continued until the king moved to the palace permanently around Regnal Year 29. Once completed, it was the largest royal residence in Egypt.

Sed Festivals 
Amenhotep celebrated three Sed Festivals in Regnal Years 30, 34, and 37, each at Malkata palace in Western Thebes.  A temple of Amun and festival hall were built especially for the celebrations. The Sed Festival was a tradition that dated to the Old Kingdom, consisting of a series of tests that demonstrated the pharaoh's fitness for continuing as ruler of Egypt. Based on indications left by Queen Tiye's steward Khenruef, the festival may have lasted two to eight months.

Amenhotep wanted his Sed Festivals to be far more spectacular than those of the past. He appointed Amenhotep, son of Hapu to plan the ceremony, potentially because he was one of the few courtiers still alive to have served at the last Sed Festival, held for Amenhotep II. In preparation for the first Sed Festival, Amenhotep, son of Hapu enlisted scribes to gather information from records and inscriptions; most of the descriptions were found in ancient funerary temples. In addition to the rituals, they collected descriptions of costumes worn at previous festivals.

Temples were built and statues erected up and down the Nile. Craftsmen and jewelers created ornaments commentating the event including jewelry, ornaments, and stelae. The scribe Nebmerutef coordinated every step of the event. He directed Amenhotep to use his mace to knock on the temple doors. Beside him, Amenhotep-Hapu mirrored his effort like a royal shadow. The king was followed by Queen Tiye and the royal daughters. When moving to another venue, the banner of the jackal god Wepwawet, "Opener of Ways" preceded the King. The king changed his costume at each major activity of the celebration.

One of the major highlights of the Festival was the king's dual coronation. He was enthroned separately for Upper and Lower Egypt. For Upper Egypt, Amenhotep wore the white crown but changed to the red crown for the Lower Egypt coronation.

After the Sed Festival, Amenhotep transcended from being a near-god to one divine. The king may have later traveled across Egypt following the festival, potentially reenacting the ceremony for different audiences. Few Egyptian kings lived long enough for their own celebration. Those who survived used the celebration as the affirmation of transition to divinity.

International Relations 

Diplomatic correspondence from Amenhotep's reign are partially preserved in the Amarna Letters, a collection of documents found near the city of Amarna. The letters come from the rulers of Assyria, Mitanni, Babylon, Hatti, and other states, typically including requests by those rulers for gold and other gifts from Amenhotep. The letters cover the period from Year 30 of Amenhotep until at least the end of Akhenaten's reign. In Amarna Letter EA 4, Amenhotep is quoted by the Babylonian king Kadashman-Enlil I in firmly rejecting the latter's entreaty to marry one of this pharaoh's daughters:

Amenhotep's refusal to allow one of his daughters to be married to the Babylonian monarch may indeed be connected with Egyptian traditional royal practices that could provide a claim upon the throne through marriage to a royal princess, or it could be viewed as a shrewd attempt on his part to enhance Egypt's prestige over those of her neighbours in the international world. Despite the refusal for his daughters to be married off to other kings, Amenhotep married several foreign princesses.

The Amarna Letters also reference the exchange between Amenhotep and the Mitanni King Tushratta of the statue of a healing goddess, Ishtar of Nineveh, late in Amenhotep's reign. Scholars have generally assumed that the statue's sojourn to Egypt was requested by Amenhotep in order to cure him of his various ailments, which included painful abscesses in his teeth. However, William L. Moran's analysis of Amarna Letter EA 23, relating to the dispatch of the statue to Thebes, discounts this theory.

The arrival of the statue is known to have coincided with Amenhotep's marriage with Tadukhepa, Tushratta's daughter, in the pharaoh's 36th year; letter EA 23's arrival in Egypt is dated to "regnal year 36, the fourth month of winter, day 1" of his reign. Furthermore, Tushratta never mentions in EA 23 that the statue's dispatch was meant to heal Amenhotep of his maladies. Instead, Tushratta writes in part:

The likeliest explanation is that the statue was sent to Egypt "to shed her blessings on the wedding of Amenhotep and Tadukhepa, as she had been sent previously for Amenhotep  and Gilukhepa." Moran explained the visit of the statue might be to heal the king, but that it is more likely that it was sent in connection with the solemnities of the marriage of Tadukhepa to Amenhotep. Further, Moran argues that the contents of Amarna Letter EA 21 support this claim, wherein Tushratta asks the gods, including Ishtar, for their blessing of the marriage.

Succession 

Thutmose, the eldest son of Amenhotep with his wife Tiye, spent at least part of his life as the Crown Prince. However, Thutmose predeceased his father and Amenhotep was ultimately succeeded by his second son, also named Amenhotep.

Proposed coregency with Amenhotep IV / Akhenaten 
It has long been theorized that Amenhotep III shared a coregency with his son and successor, Amenhotep IV (later called Akhenaten). Writing in 1998, Lawrence Berman claimed that proponents of the coregency theory tended to be art historians, while historians remained unconvinced. Whether this remains true is unclear.

Eric Cline, Nicholas Reeves, Peter Dorman, and other scholars argue strongly against the establishment of a long coregency between the two rulers and in favor of either no coregency or one lasting at most two years. Donald B. Redford, William J. Murnane, Alan Gardiner, and Lawrence Berman contest the view of any coregency whatsoever between Akhenaten and his father.

Evidence against a coregency includes Amarna Letter EA 27, which is dated to Regnal Year 2 of Amenhotep IV. The subject of the letter involves a complaint from the Mitannian king Tushratta, claiming that Amenhotep IV did not honor his father's promise to send Tushratta gold statues as part of the marriage arrangement between Tadukhepa, and Amenhotep III. This correspondence implies that if any coregency occurred between Amenhotep and Akhenaten, it lasted no more than a year.

However in February 2014, Egyptian Ministry of Antiquities announced that findings from the tomb of Vizier Amenhotep-Huy gave "conclusive evidence" of a coregency that lasted at least eight years. In the tomb, the cartouches of the two pharaohs were carved side by side. However, this conclusion has since been called into question by other egyptologists, according to whom the inscription means only that construction on Amenhotep-Huy's tomb started during Amenhotep III's reign and ended under Akhenaten's, and Amenhotep-Huy thus simply wanted to pay his respects to both rulers.

Later life

Health and death
Amenhotep's greatest attested regnal date is Year 38, which appears on wine jar-label dockets from Malkata. He may have lived briefly into an unrecorded Year 39 and died before the wine harvest of that year. Reliefs from the wall of the temple of Soleb in Nubia and scenes from the Theban tomb of Kheruef, Steward of the King's Great Wife, Tiye, depict Amenhotep as a visibly weak and sick figure. Scientists believe that in his final years he suffered from arthritis and became obese. Further, a forensic examination of his mummy shows that he was probably in constant pain during his final years owing to his worn and cavity-pitted teeth. An examination of his mummy by the Australian anatomist Grafton Elliot Smith concluded that the pharaoh had died at between 40 and 50 year.

He was survived by at least one child, his successor, Amenhotep IV, and by his wife Tiye, who is known to have outlived him by at least twelve years, as she is mentioned in several Amarna letters that are dated from her son's reign as well as depicted at a dinner table with Akhenaten and his royal family in scenes from the tomb of Huya, which were made during Year 9 and Year 12 of her son's reign.

Foreign leaders communicated their grief at the pharaoh's death, with Tushratta saying:

Amenhotep was buried in the Western Valley of the Valley of the Kings, in Tomb WV22. Sometime during the Third Intermediate Period, his mummy was moved from this tomb and was placed in a side chamber of KV35 along with several other pharaohs of the Eighteenth and Nineteenth Dynasties, where it lay until it was discovered by Victor Loret in 1898.

Mummy and burial

For the 18th dynasty, the mummy shows an unusually heavy use of subcutaneous stuffing to make the mummy look more lifelike. Amenhotep was buried in the Valley of the Kings outside of Thebes, in the tomb labeled WV 22. The tomb is the largest in the West Valley of the Kings and includes two side chambers for his Great Royal Wives, Tiye and Sitamun. However, it does not seem as if either woman was buried there. Amenhotep's mummy was later moved to the mummy cache in KV35, during the reign of Smendes.
In the present day, Amenhotep's mummy has the inventory number CG 61074.

In 1980, James Harris and Edward F. Wente conducted X-ray examinations of New Kingdom Pharaoh's crania and skeletal remains, which included the mummified remains of Amenhotep III. The authors determined that the royal mummies of the 18th Dynasty bore strong similarities to contemporary Nubians with slight differences.

In April 2021, his mummy was moved from the Museum of Egyptian Antiquities to the National Museum of Egyptian Civilization, along with those of 17 other kings and 4 queens in an event termed the Pharaohs' Golden Parade.

Monuments and legacy

Amenhotep has the distinction of having the most surviving statues of any Egyptian pharaoh, with over 250 of his statues having been discovered and identified. Since these statues span his entire life, they provide a series of portraits covering the entire length of his reign.

When Amenhotep died, he left behind a country that was at the very height of its power and influence, commanding immense respect in the international world; however, he also bequeathed an Egypt that was wedded to its traditional political and religious certainties under the Amun priesthood.

The resulting upheavals from his son Akhenaten's reforming zeal shook these old certainties to their very foundations and brought forth the central question of whether a pharaoh was more powerful than the existing domestic order as represented by the Amun priests and their numerous temple estates. Akhenaten even moved the capital away from the city of Thebes in an effort to break the influence of that powerful temple and assert his own preferred choice of deities, the Aten. Akhenaten moved the Egyptian capital to the site known today as Amarna (though originally known as Akhetaten, 'Horizon of Aten'), and eventually suppressed the worship of Amun.

Amenhotep built extensively at the temple of Karnak including the Luxor temple which consisted of two pylons, a colonnade behind the new temple entrance, and a new temple to the goddess Ma'at. Amenhotep dismantled the Fourth Pylon of the Temple of Amun at Karnak to construct a new pylon — the Third Pylon — and created a new entrance to this structure where he erected two rows of columns with open papyrus capitals down the centre of this newly formed forecourt. The forecourt between the Third and Fourth Pylons, sometimes called an obelisk court, was also decorated with scenes of the sacred barque of the deities Amun, Mut, and Khonsu being carried in funerary boats. The king also started work on the Tenth Pylon at the Temple of Amun there. Amenhotep's first recorded act as king — in his Years 1 and 2 — was to open new limestone quarries at Tura, just south of Cairo and at Dayr al-Barsha in Middle Egypt in order to herald his great building projects.

His enormous mortuary temple on the west bank of the Nile was, in its day, the largest religious complex in Thebes, but unfortunately the king chose to build it too close to the floodplain, and less than two hundred years later it stood in ruins. Much of the masonry was purloined by Merneptah and later pharaohs for their own construction projects. Amenhotep  also built the Third Pylon at Karnak and erected 600 statues of the goddess Sekhmet in the Temple of Mut, south of Karnak. Some of the most magnificent statues of New Kingdom Egypt date to his reign "such as the two outstanding couchant rose granite lions originally set before the temple at Soleb in Nubia" as well as a large series of royal sculptures. Several beautiful black granite seated statues of Amenhotep wearing the nemes headress have come from excavations behind the Colossi of Memnon as well as from Tanis in the Delta. In 2014, two giant statues of Amenhotep  that were toppled by an earthquake in 1200 BC were reconstructed from more than 200 fragments and re-erected at the northern gate of the king's funerary temple.

One of the most stunning finds of royal statues dating to his reign was made as recently as 1989 in the courtyard of Amenhotep 's colonnade of the Temple of Luxor where a cache of statues was found, including a -high pink quartzite statue of the king wearing the Double Crown found in near-perfect condition. It was mounted on a sled, and may have been a cult statue. The only damage it had sustained was that the name of the god Amun had been hacked out wherever it appeared in the pharaoh's cartouche, clearly done as part of the systematic effort to eliminate any mention of this god during the reign of his successor, Akhenaten.

In 2021, excavations revealed a settlement near Amenhotep's mortuary temple, called the Dazzling Aten, which is believed to have been built by Amenhotep. It is presumed to have housed craftsmen and labourers working on royal monuments and projects at Thebes, as well as in the ancillary industries needed to support such an administrative and skilled-worker population, and had its own bakery and cemetery.

One of the king's most popular epithets was Aten-tjehen which means "the Dazzling Sun Disk"; it appears in his titulary at Luxor temple and, more frequently, was used as the name for one of his palaces as well as the Year 11 royal barge, and denotes a company of men in Amenhotep's army.
A Sed Festival Stela of Amenhotep III was taken from Egypt to Europe by an art dealer. It is now believed to be in the United States but not on public display. In Europe, Dr. Eric Cassirer at one time owned the stela. The dimensions of the white alabaster stela are 10 × 9 cm (3.94 × 3.54 in), but only the upper half of the stela survived. It was shaped in the form of a temple pylon with a gradual narrowing near the top.

Front view: The god Heh, who represents the number one million, holds notched palm leaves signifying years. Above his head, Heh appears to support the cartouche of Amenhotep  symbolically for a million years.

Side view: A series of festival (ḥb) emblems together with a Sed (sd) emblem identifying the stela as one made for Amenhotep 's Sed Festival royal jubilee.

Top view: The top shows malicious damage to the stela where the cartouche was chipped away.

Back view: Like the top view, the cartouche has been eradicated.

Cassirer suggests Akhenaten, Amenhotep's son and successor, was responsible for defacing the king's name on the stela. Akhenaten detested his royal family name so much, he changed his own name from Amenhotep IV to Akhenaten; he vandalized any reference to the god Amun since he had chosen to worship another god, the Aten. Other gods displayed on the stela, Re and Ma’at, showed no sign of vandalism.

The stela is believed to have been displayed prominently in Akhenaten's new capital city of Akhetaten (current day Amarna). With the royal name and Amun references removed, it probably had a prominent place in a temple or palace of Akhenaten. Akhenaten could then display the stela without reminders of his old family name or the false god Amun, yet celebrate his father's achievement.

Another striking characteristic of Amenhotep's reign is the series of over 200 large commemorative stone scarabs that have been discovered over a large geographic area ranging from Syria (Ras Shamra) through to Soleb in Nubia. Similarly, five other scarabs state that his wife Gilukhepa of Mitanni arrived in Egypt with a retinue of 317 women. She was the first of many such princesses who would enter the pharaoh's household.

Ancestry

Gallery

See also

 Colossal red granite statue of Amenhotep III
 Colossal quartzite statue of Amenhotep III
 History of ancient Egypt
 Eighteenth dynasty of Egypt Family Tree
 List of pharaohs
 Quay with Sphinxes
 The lion hunts of Amenhotep III during the first ten years of his reign

Footnotes

Bibliography

 
 
 
 
 
 
 
 
 
 
 
 
 
 
 
 
 
 
 
 
 
 
 
 
 
 

 
1350s BC deaths
14th-century BC Pharaohs
Pharaohs of the Eighteenth Dynasty of Egypt
Egyptian architects
Ancient child monarchs
Ancient Egyptian mummies
Year of birth unknown
Children of Thutmose IV